The Frederick Hotel is a historic building in Loup City, Nebraska. It was built in 1913 for Viola Rosseter Odendahl, the daughter of hotelier Cyrus Rosseter and the widow of druggist Charles Odendahl. In 1939, the hotel was acquired by Odendahl's sons, and it closed down in the 1990s. The building has been listed on the National Register of Historic Places since October 16, 2002.

References

External links

National Register of Historic Places in Sherman County, Nebraska
Early Commercial architecture in the United States
Hotel buildings completed in 1913